Luvinate is a comune (municipality) in the Province of Varese in the Italian region Lombardy, located about  northwest of Milan and about  northwest of Varese.

Luvinate borders the following municipalities: Barasso, Casciago, Castello Cabiaglio, Varese.

Demographic evolution

References

External links
 www.comune.luvinate.va.it

Cities and towns in Lombardy